Delma Cowart (July 6, 1941 – November 10, 2021) was an American stock car racing driver. While never achieving much success, Cowart achieved notoriety for being the "clown prince of racing" in the 1980s and 1990s. His jovial nature made him a favorite among competitors.

Racing career

Cowart began competing in NASCAR in the Late Model Sportsman Division, now the NASCAR Xfinity Series. His notoriety in that series came in 1979 Permatex 300 at Daytona. On lap four, Joe Frasson had wrecked and was sitting in the middle of the race track. Cowart hit Frasson at nearly full speed igniting Frasson's fuel tank into a ball of fire. Neither Frasson or Cowart were injured in the crash although Don Williams was critically injured trying to avoid the accident. When changes to the structure of the late model series were made, Cowart decided that the rising expenses in that series would make it just as economically feasible to race in the Winston Cup Series. 

Cowart made his first start in NASCAR by qualifying for the 1981 Atlanta Journal 500 with owner Heyward Grooms. That day he finished 18th. In 1982, Cowart earned his best career finish, in the Firecracker 400 at Daytona, scoring 17th.

A superspeedway driver, Cowart qualified for the Daytona 500 four times, each time throwing an extravagant party for members of the NASCAR community in celebration.

Cowart's primary career was installing pools and septic tanks in the Savannah, Georgia area. He used his day job to advance his racing, once trading Junior Johnson's engine builder a swimming pool for a racing engine.

Tracks
Cowart's main tracks were Daytona International Speedway or Talladega Superspeedway, but he did run in the 1992 race at Rockingham, North Carolina. Cowart also tried, but failed, to make the 1994 Brickyard 400.

Numbers
He mainly ran the #0 during his time in the Cup Series, but he also ran the #49 at Daytona in 1987 (also a DNQ). Cowart repeatedly joked that he was the only driver whose car number matched his chance of winning. The inspiration for the number use was from Billy Preston's song, Nothing From Nothing. The song was a favorite of Cowart's.

He also ran the #37 at Daytona in 1982 in what is now the Xfinity Series.

1992 Daytona 500
Cowart made the 1992 Daytona 500 and made his trademark quote, "I ain't never won a race, though I ain't lost a party." An accident-filled qualifying race allowed Cowart to finish 13th and advance to the Daytona 500. "When we made the race," Cowart said, "I went out and hired a team physician. I figured we needed a team physician. I figured we needed one for all the physical requirements of our fine crew. What does the doctor specialize in? He's a veterinarian, because all we've got on our crew is a bunch of dogs!" A legendary party ensued at a Daytona area hotel. "I don't think he showed back up at the track until Sunday," Benny Parsons recalled.

The Daytona 500 that year was plagued by accidents, allowing Cowart to finish  25th, earning a career high $23,285. With the money, he bought a big screen TV and travelled to the following race at Rockingham, finishing 35th there.

Final years
Cowart tried to make the Daytona 500 from 1993 to 1997, but failed each time. His last race was the 1997 Winston Open, but he was flagged shortly after the start. Delma Cowart Racing brought two race cars to Charlotte Motor Speedway that weekend. One was for the ARCA race as the newer Penske Ford that Delma had bought was for the Cup race. The Cup engine developed a problem so the team decided to make an engine change. The problems that followed were that the clutch components, some of the brackets, etc., were different from what Delma had as backup parts. Once the ARCA race had completed the team worked feverishly on the Cup car to make the race. 

It was about 4:00 pm when the team started making the engine change as well as trying make all of the pieces fit together; by the time the car was ready it was roughly 6:00 pm. The green flag was to drop at 7:30 pm. The car had yet to pass inspection. A little after 6:00 pm, the team started the car and found that there was a transmission problem. The team now had a decision to make: to quit or keep on working. The team decided to go and make the transmission swap. Later on, the command to start engines went out. At that time Delma was still in the garage area and he started his. He left the garage area and entered the track only to see the black flag displayed. A few caution laps were made and then Delma decided to pull off. At that time the NASCAR officials were present in the garage area as Delma and his crew chief had a meeting in the NASCAR trailer.

In later years Delma was featured in a Growing Bolder interview. When asked to as why he did what he did, he said, "Look, it wasn't a points race, just a money race, and the crew worked so hard, I wasn't about to let them down."

In early 1998, at age 56, Cowart announced his retirement at Whiskey Pete's, a saloon in Holly Hill, Florida. "I'm a dinosaur," Cowart said "There ain't no room for guys like me no more. To me, racing was a hobby. Now, you gotta have money."           

Cowart died on November 10, 2021, at the age of 80.

Motorsports career results

NASCAR
(key) (Bold – Pole position awarded by qualifying time. Italics – Pole position earned by points standings or practice time. * – Most laps led.)

Winston Cup Series

Daytona 500

Budweiser Late Model Sportsman Series

ARCA Bondo/Mar-Hyde Series
(key) (Bold – Pole position awarded by qualifying time. Italics – Pole position earned by points standings or practice time. * – Most laps led.)

References

External links
 

1941 births
2021 deaths
ARCA Menards Series drivers
NASCAR drivers
Sportspeople from Savannah, Georgia